The grasshopper subfamily Acridinae, sometimes called silent slant-faced grasshoppers, belong of the large family Acrididae in the Orthoptera: Caelifera.

Description
In appearance, the species are often similar to those of the subfamily Gomphocerinae, with whom they share a slanted face. However Acridinae differ from Gomphocerinae in that they lack stridulatory pegs on their hind legs and thus, as the common name suggests, do not make sounds. The antennae of this species is flattened and sword-like, a trait also shared with some gomphocerines and also with the spurthroated grasshoppers (subfamily Cyrtacanthacridinae).  They lack the posternal spine seen in the spurthroated grasshoppers and lubber grasshoppers (subfamily Romaleinae).  Hind wings in this species range from nearly colorless to colorless.

Tribes and genera
The Orthoptera Species File lists the following:

Acridini
Auth.: MacLeay, 1821; distribution: widespread in warmer parts of the Old World & Australasia(partial list):
 Acrida Linnaeus, 1758
 Acridarachnea Bolívar, I., 1908
 Cryptobothrus Rehn, 1907
 Keshava (insect) Gupta & Chandra, 2017

Calephorini

Auth.: Yin, 1982; distribution: Africa, Europe, Indo-China; single genus:
 Calephorus Fieber, 1853

Gymnobothrini

Auth.: Uvarov, 1953 - Africa
 Brachybothrus Popov, 2019
 Chirista Karsch, 1893
 Comacris Bolívar, 1890
 Coryphosima Karsch, 1893
 Guichardippus Dirsh, 1959
 Gymnobothrus Bolívar, 1889
 Hulstaertia Ramme, 1931
 Keya (insect) Uvarov, 1941
 Malcolmburria Uvarov, 1953
 Oxybothrus Uvarov, 1953
 Rastafaria Ramme, 1931
 Roduniella Bolívar, 1914
 Tenuihippus Willemse, 1994
 Zacompsa Karsch, 1893

Hyalopterygini
Auth.: Brunner von Wattenwyl, 1893; distribution: Americas
 Allotruxalis Rehn, 1944
 Cocytotettix Rehn, 1906
 Eutryxalis Bruner, 1900
 Guaranacris Rehn, 1944
 Hyalopteryx Charpentier, 1845
 Metaleptea Brunner von Wattenwyl, 1893
 Neorphula Donato, 2004
 Orphula Stål, 1873
 Parorphula Bruner, 1900
 Paulacris Rehn, 1944

Pargaini
Auth.: Uvarov, 1953 - Africa
 Acteana Karsch, 1896
 Machaeridia Stål, 1873
 Odontomelus Bolívar, 1890
 Parga (insect) Walker, 1870
 Phryganomelus Jago, 1983

Phlaeobini

Auth.: Brunner von Wattenwyl, 1893 - Africa, Middle East, Asia - selected genera:
 genus group Afrophlaeoba Jago, 1983
 genus group Duronia Stål, 1876
 genus group  Ocnocerus Bolívar, 1889
 genus group not determined:
 Cannula Bolívar, 1906
 Chlorophlaeoba Ramme, 1941
 Oxyphlaeobella Ramme, 1941
 Phlaeoba Stål, 1861

Truxalini
Auth.: Serville, 1838
 Acridarachnea - monotypic A. ophthalmica Bolívar, 1908
 Chromotruxalis Dirsh, 1950
 Oxytruxalis Dirsh, 1950
 Truxalis Fabricius, 1775
 Truxaloides Dirsh, 1950
 Xenotruxalis Dirsh, 1950 - monotypic X. fenestrata (Ramme, 1929)

Genera incertae sedis

 Aeropedelloides Liu, 1981
 Anaeolopus Uvarov, 1922
 Bababuddinia Bolívar, 1917
 Bambesiana Koçak & Kemal, 2008
 Brachyacrida Dirsh, 1952
 Calliphlaeoba Ramme, 1941
 Capulica Bolívar, 1917
 Carinacris Liu, 1984
 Carliola Uvarov, 1939
 Chromacrida Dirsh, 1952
 Closteridea Scudder, 1893
 Cohembia Uvarov, 1953
 Conuacris Willemse, 1932
 Covasacris Liebermann, 1970
 Dorsthippus Donskoff, 1977
 Duroniopsis Bolívar, 1914
 Eoscyllina Rehn, 1909
 Epacromiacris Willemse, 1933
 Euprepoptera Uvarov, 1953
 Euthynous Stål, 1877
 Julea Bolívar, 1914
 Kaloa (insect) Bolívar, 1909
 Lemuracris Dirsh, 1966
 Lobopoma Karsch, 1896
 Luzonica Willemse, 1933
 Megaphlaeoba Willemse, 1951
 Neophlaeoba Usmani & Shafee, 1983
 Nimbacris Popov & Fishpool, 1992
 Nivisacris Liu, 1984
 Orthochtha Karsch, 1891
 Oxyolena Karsch, 1893
 Oxyphlaeoba Ramme, 1941
 Palawanacris Ramme, 1941
 Pamacris Ramme, 1929
 Paracoryphosima Descamps & Wintrebert, 1966
 Paraduronia Bolívar, 1909
 Paraphlaeoba Bolívar, 1902
 Paraphlaeobida Willemse, 1951
 Pasiphimus Bolívar, 1914
 Perella (insect) Bolívar, 1914
 Phlocerus Fischer von Waldheim, 1833
 Phorinia (insect) Bolívar, 1914
 Plagiacris Sjöstedt, 1931
 Pseudoeoscyllina Liang & Jia, 1992
 Pseudopargaella Descamps & Wintrebert, 1966
 Pseudoptygonotus Zheng, 1977
 Ruganotus Yin, 1979
 Rugophlaeoba Willemse, 1951
 Shabacris Popov & Fishpool, 1992
 Sherifuria Uvarov, 1926
 Urugalla Uvarov, 1927
 Vietteacris Descamps & Wintrebert, 1966
 Vitalisia Bolívar, 1914
 Weenenia Miller, 1932
 Wellawaya (insect) Uvarov, 1927
 Xenocymochtha Popov & Fishpool, 1992
 Xenoderus Uvarov, 1925
 Yendia Ramme, 1929
 Zambiacris Johnsen, 1983
 Zygophlaeoba Bolívar, 1902

Genera sometimes or formerly placed here 
 Achurum and Mermiria (otherwise in Gomphocerinae) 
 Gastrimargus (otherwise in Oedipodinae).
 the tribe Parapleurini (containing Stethophyma) is now placed in Oedipodinae.

References

External links

 
Acrididae
Taxa named by William Sharp Macleay